Harry Tisch (March 28, 1927, Heinrichswalde – June 18, 1995) was an East German politician and trade unionist who served as Chairman of the Free German Trade Union Federation between 1975 and 1989. He was also a member of the State Council from 1976 until he was forced to resign in November 1989.

He was a recipient of the Patriotic Order of Merit in Gold in 1969 and the Order of Karl Marx in 1977.

After German reunification Tisch was not tried in court due to his declining health. He died of heart failure in 1995.

1927 births
1995 deaths
People from Vorpommern-Greifswald
People from the Province of Pomerania
Members of the Politburo of the Central Committee of the Socialist Unity Party of Germany
Members of the State Council of East Germany
Members of the 4th Volkskammer
Members of the 5th Volkskammer
Members of the 6th Volkskammer
Members of the 7th Volkskammer
Members of the 8th Volkskammer
Members of the 9th Volkskammer
Free German Trade Union Federation members
Members of the Landtag of Mecklenburg-Western Pomerania
German politicians convicted of crimes
Recipients of the Patriotic Order of Merit in gold
Recipients of the Banner of Labor